Genesee Neighborhood is a historic neighborhood in Lansing, Michigan.  It is located in the northwest corner of downtown Lansing.  The neighborhood is bordered by West Saginaw Street (M-43) to the north, Sycamore Street to the east, West Ottawa Street to the south, and Martin Luther King Blvd to the west.

References

External links
 Lansing, Michigan neighborhoods
 Lansing Neighborhood Council 

Geography of Lansing, Michigan